T. G. Sheppard's Greatest Hits is the first compilation album by the American country music artist of the same name. It was released in 1983 via Warner Bros. and Curb Records. The album includes the single "Without You"

Track listing

Chart performance

References

1983 compilation albums
T. G. Sheppard albums
Warner Records compilation albums
Curb Records compilation albums